The Mercedes-Benz M15 engine is a naturally-aspirated, 1.7-liter, straight-6, internal combustion piston engine, designed, developed and produced by Mercedes-Benz; between 1931 and 1936.

M15 Engine
The engine featured central lubrication and the water-based cooling system for the engine employed both a pump and a thermostat. Power was transmitted to the rear wheels via what was in effect a four-speed manual transmission, on which the top gear operated as a form of overdrive. Third gear used the 1:1 ratio conventionally used by a top gear, and there was a fourth gear with a ratio of 1 : 0.73.

Applications
Mercedes-Benz W15

References

Mercedes-Benz engines
Straight-six engines
Engines by model
Gasoline engines by model